Linda or Lynn Anders(s)on or Andersen is the name of:

Linda Anderson (artist) (born 1941), American folk artist
Linda Anderson, character in Beethoven's 2nd
Lin Anderson, Scottish writer
Linda Andersson (born 1972), Swedish swimmer
Linda Andersen (born 1969), Norwegian sailor
Lynn Anderson (1947–2015), American country singer